Galeh or Geleh may refer to:
 Geleh, Khuzestan, a village in  Khuzestan Province in Iran
 Geleh, Kurdistan
 Galeh, Lorestan

See also
 Geleh Shur